Fabio Viviani (born 29 September 1966 in Lucca) is an Italian professional football coach and former player, who played as a midfielder. He is currently manager of Al-Ittihad Kalba.

Playing career
Viviani played for 7 seasons (145 games, 3 goals) in the Serie A for Calcio Como, A.C. Milan and, most notably, Vicenza Calcio.

After winning the 1996–97 Coppa Italia, he reached the semi-final of the 1997–98 UEFA Cup Winners' Cup with Vicenza Calcio.

Coaching career
After retiring from his career as a footballer, Viviani stayed at Vicenza as part of the coaching staff, serving as caretaker during the 2001–02 season alongside Adelio Moro, and then as youth coach until 2005. He successively left Vicenza in order to follow his mentor Edoardo Reja at Napoli, working alongside him as assistant coach. During the 2009–10 season he then served as head coach of Lega Pro Seconda Divisione club Sambonifacese. In July 2010 he was called to replace Eugenio Corini at Serie B club Portosummaga, being however removed from his managerial duties  on 29 November 2010 due to poor results.

On 5 December 2011 he was unveiled as new head coach of Grosseto, until 1 February 2012 when he was sacked.

On 9 October 2014 he was hired by Serie A club Palermo as Giuseppe Iachini's new technical collaborator.

On the 10 February 2020, he was appointed as the new coach of Fujairah. He left when his contract expired in summer of the same year.

Honours

Club
Milan
 European Cup winner: 1988–89.

Vicenza
 Coppa Italia winner: 1996–97.

References

1966 births
Living people
Italian footballers
Serie A players
Serie B players
Serie C players
Como 1907 players
A.C. Milan players
A.C. Monza players
L.R. Vicenza players
Treviso F.B.C. 1993 players
Association football midfielders
Italian football managers
L.R. Vicenza managers
Palermo F.C. managers
Al-Ittihad Kalba SC managers
Fujairah FC managers
UAE Pro League managers
Italian expatriate football managers
Expatriate football managers in the United Arab Emirates
Italian expatriate sportspeople in the United Arab Emirates